Mitsugu (written: ,  or  in hiragana) is a masculine Japanese given name. Notable people with the name include:

, Japanese sumo wrestler
, Japanese World War II flying ace
, Japanese footballer
, Japanese photographer
, pen-name of Kanegai Hideyoshi, Japanese writer
, Japanese cyclist

Japanese masculine given names